WTMV-LD (channel 21) is a low-power television station licensed to Ogden, North Carolina, United States, and serving the Wilmington area as an affiliate of Cozi TV. The station is owned by Tutt Media Group.

Subchannels
The station's digital signal is multiplexed:

References

External links

Television channels and stations established in 2010
TMV-LD
Cozi TV affiliates
Antenna TV affiliates
Start TV affiliates
Movies! affiliates
Low-power television stations in the United States